Alticane is an unincorporated community in the Rural Municipality of Douglas No. 436, Saskatchewan, Canada, located at 52° 54' 18.0" N, 107° 29' 02.4" W, at an elevation of 710 meters.

Alticane was established in 1928 on the new Canadian National Railway branch line that ran between Speers and Mayfair.  In that year, the area post office, run by Mr. McKye, was moved from its previous location 2 miles southwest to the new location near the branch line, bringing the post office's name to the new town.  Alticane was named after Mr. McKye's home town in Scotland.

The town contained a Saskatchewan Pool grain elevator which has since been dismantled. The abandoned CNR branch line was also removed around 2015.  Alticane is now considered a ghost town with approximately one dozen abandoned houses remaining.  A cairn can be seen at the entrance to the town that commemorates the 70th (1998) reunion of the residents.

See also 
 Twisted Trees

References

External links 
 Photo gallery at Ghost Towns Canada
 Saskatchewan Cemeteries

Douglas No. 436, Saskatchewan
Unincorporated communities in Saskatchewan
Division No. 16, Saskatchewan